Dassault Systèmes Simulia Corp. is a computer-aided engineering (CAE) vendor. Formerly known as Abaqus Inc. and previously Hibbitt, Karlsson & Sorensen, Inc., (HKS), the company was founded in 1978 by David Hibbitt, Bengt Karlsson and Paul Sorensen, and has its headquarters in Providence, Rhode Island.

In October 2005, Dassault Systèmes acquired Abaqus, Inc. and announced Simulia, the brand encompassing all DS simulation solutions, including Abaqus and Catia Analysis applications. Dassault Systèmes Simulia Corp. is the legal entity that encompasses the Simulia brand of Dassault Systèmes.

Abaqus product suite

The Abaqus suite consists of three core products: Abaqus/Standard, Abaqus/Explicit and Abaqus/CAE (Complete Abaqus Environment). In addition to this, recent versions of Abaqus (6.10 onwards) also contain Abaqus/CFD for computational fluid dynamic simulations. Each of these packages offers additional, optional modules that address specialized capabilities required by some customers.

Abaqus/Standard provides Abaqus analysis technology to solve traditional implicit finite element analysis, including static, dynamic, and thermal analyses, all powered with the widest range of contact and nonlinear material options. Abaqus/Standard also has optional add-on and interface products that address design sensitivity analysis, offshore engineering, and integration with third-party software, e.g. plastic injection molding analysis.

Abaqus/Explicit provides analysis technology focused on transient dynamics and quasi-static analyses using an explicit time integration, which is appropriate in many applications, such as drop tests, crushing, and manufacturing processes.

Abaqus/CAE provides a complete modeling and visualization environment for Abaqus analysis products. With direct access to CAD models, advanced meshing and visualization, and with an exclusive view towards Abaqus analysis products, Abaqus/CAE is the modeling environment of choice for many Abaqus users.

Abaqus/CFD provides advanced computational fluid dynamics capabilities with extensive support for pre- and postprocessing provided in Abaqus/CAE. These scalable parallel CFD simulation capabilities address a broad range of nonlinear coupled fluid-thermal and fluid-structural problems.

Simulia

In addition to the development of the pre-existing Abaqus portfolio, DS has also developed Simulia V5 and V6 product suites which seeks to combine the modelling and simulations aspect into one tool.

CST Studio Suite

CST Studio Suite is a computational electromagnetics tool developed by Dassault Systèmes Simulia. It contains several different simulation methods, including the finite integration technique (FIT), finite element method (FEM), transmission line matrix (TLM), multilevel fast multipole method (MLFMM) and particle-in-cell (PIC), as well as multiphysics solvers for other domains of physics with links to electromagnetics.

The predecessor to CST Studio Suite,  ("solving Maxwell's equations with the Finite Integration Algorithm"), was sold by CST, a university spin-off from TU Darmstadt founded in 1992 to commercialize the FIT method originally invented in 1977 by Thomas Weiland. Although the software was initially developed for particle accelerator laboratories, it found application in microwave engineering, and so FIT was implemented in CST Microwave Studio (CST MWS) in 1998, which became CST Studio Suite in 2005. CST was acquired by Dassault Systèmes in 2016, and since then CST Studio Suite has been a product of Simulia.

The time domain FIT method uses a proprietary meshing technique called perfect boundary approximation (PBA) to represent curved surfaces in a hexahedral mesh, and there is also a frequency domain FEM solver. Other methods include the MLFMM and shooting boundary ray EM solvers. There are also multiphysics solvers such as PIC, wakefield, thermal and structural mechanics.

The computer aided design (CAD) tools and 3D geometry engine in CST Studio Suite are based on the ACIS kernel. Hardware acceleration is provided by both Nvidia GPUs and Intel Xeon Phi.

As an electromagnetic design tool, CST Studio Suite is chiefly used in industries such as telecommunications, defense, automotive, aerospace, electronics and medical equipment. One application of CST Studio Suite is the design and placement of antennas and other radio-frequency components. The antenna systems on the BepiColombo Mercury Planetary Orbiter were developed using CST Studio Suite to investigate their radiation pattern and possible electromagnetic interference.
 
Electromagnetic compatibility (EMC) – the analysis and mitigation of interference and electromagnetic environmental effects – is another application, because simulation allows potential issues to be identified earlier in the design process than physical testing alone can. Similarly, CST Studio Suite is also used to analyze signal integrity – the quality of electric signal transmission – on printed circuit boards and other electronics.

Other areas of research where CST Studio Suite has been applied include accelerator physics, biological electromagnetics, nanotechnology and metamaterials.

References

Software companies based in Rhode Island
Software companies established in 1978
Companies based in Providence, Rhode Island
1978 establishments in Rhode Island
Software companies of the United States